Húsdrápa (Old Norse: 'House-Lay') is a skaldic poem partially preserved in the Prose Edda where disjoint stanzas of it are quoted. It is attributed to the skald Úlfr Uggason. The poem describes mythological scenes carved on kitchen panels. In the stanzas that have come down to us three such scenes are described.

 Thor's fishing trip.
 Baldr's funeral.
 An obscure myth understood by Snorri Sturluson to deal with a competition between Loki and Heimdallr for Brísingamen.

Húsdrápa is often compared with Haustlöng and Ragnarsdrápa which also describe artworks depicting mythological scenes.

The poem is mentioned in Laxdæla saga:

"The wedding feast was a very crowded one, for the new hall was finished. Ulf Uggason was of the bidden guests, and he had made a poem on Olaf Hoskuldson and of the legends that were painted round the hall, and he gave it forth at the feast. This poem is called the House Song, and is well made. Olaf rewarded him well for the poem."

References

Bibliography

Further reading

Hollander, Lee M. (1968). The skalds : a selection of their poems. [Ann Arbor]: University of Michigan Press.
Press, Muriel (transl.) (1899). Laxdale Saga. London: The Temple Classics.

See also 

 Ekphrasis

External links
Húsdrápa in Old Norse from «Kulturformidlingen norrøne tekster og kvad» Norway.
Húsdrápa Old Norse edition and English translation at Skaldic Project.

10th-century poems
Skaldic poems
Works based on art